Mirandiba is a city  in the state of Pernambuco, Brazil. The population in 2020, according with IBGE was 15,470 inhabitants and the total area is 821.68 km2.

Geography

The municipality was designated a priority area for conservation and sustainable use when the Caatinga Ecological Corridor was created in 2006.

 State - Pernambuco
 Region - Sertão Pernambucano
 Boundaries - São José do Belmonte    (N);  Carnaubeira da Penha    (S);  Serra Talhada   (E);    Salgueiro and Verdejante    (W).
 Area - 809.26 km2
 Elevation - 450 m
 Hydrography - Pajeú River
 Vegetation - Caatinga  hiperxerófila
 Climate - semi arid - (Sertão) hot
 Annual average temperature - 25.2 c
 Distance to Recife - 470 km

Economy

The main economic activities in Mirandiba are based in commerce and agribusiness, especially creation of goats, sheep, pigss, cattle, chickens;  and plantations of tomatoes and  beans.

Economic Indicators

Economy by Sector
2006

Health Indicators

References

Municipalities in Pernambuco